Mavli is a tehsil of Udaipur district in Rajasthan, India.The tehsil consists of 179 revenue villages which are organized in 42 gram panchayats and one town (Mavli). The tehsil headquarter is located in the town of Mavli. The boundaries of Mavli tehsil are conterminous with those of Mavli panchayat samiti.

History 
Before the formation of the Republic of India, the territory of present-day Mavli tehsil was part of the former Udaipur State. With the formation of the United State of Rajasthan (precursor to the state of Rajasthan) in 1948, the new district of Udaipur was constituted which included Mavli tehsil.

Geography
The area of Mavli tehsil is 837 square kilometres. The tehsil is bordered by Girwa tehsil to the west, Rajsamand district to the north, Chittaurgarh district to the east, and Vallabhnagar tehsil to the south. The annual average rainfall in Mavli tehsil is 604 mm, with an average of 30 rainy days per year.

22 villages of Mavli that are in the vicinity of the city of the Udaipur urban area are subject to the jurisdiction urban planning policies of the Udaipur Urban Improvement Trust.

Demographics 
The population of Mavli tehsil is 230,532, of which 96% is classified as rural in the 2011 census. The sex ratio in the tehsil is 967. The tehsil's literacy rate is 52%.Mewari is the predominant language used in the tehsil, being the first language for 98% of the population of the tehsil.

Economy 
Agriculture is a significant sources of income in Mavli tehsil with 57% of workers identifying as cultivators or agricultural labourers in the 2011 census.

References 

Tehsils of Rajasthan
Tehsils of Udaipur district